Mazzitelli is an Italian surname. Notable people with the surname include:

Eduardo Mazzitelli (born 1952), Argentine comics writer
Luca Mazzitelli (born 1995), Italian footballer

Italian-language surnames